The English Women's Curling Championship is the national women's curling championship for England.The championship decides which team of curlers is sent to the European Curling Championships (and the same year's World Curling Championships, if England qualifies) the following season.  It has been held annually since 1976. It is organized by the English Curling Association.

Past champions

See also
English Men's Curling Championship
English Mixed Doubles Curling Championship
English Mixed Curling Championship

References

Women

1976 establishments in England
Recurring sporting events established in 1976
National curling championships